Dr. Cesar Parra is an American dressage rider and coach who has successfully competed and medaled in international competitions including Pan American Games, Central American Games, World Cup finals, World Equestrian Games and Olympics, for over 20 years.  Parra has competed for the United States of America since 2008. Originally from Colombia and a dentist by profession, Parra has won hundreds of international competitions, including multiple medals at the Bolivarian Games and the Central American Games, and a Silver Team Medal at the 1998 Pan American Games for his native country, Colombia. As a Colombian, he also participated in the 2004 Olympic Games, in Athens, and in the 2005 FEI World Cup Finals, in Las Vegas. He also competed twice at the World Equestrian games, in Jerez 2002 and Aachen 2006.

Since gaining his US citizenship in 2008, he has continued his winning ways, helping Team USA secure a Team Gold Medal at the 2011 Pan American Games in Guadalajara, Mexico, and consistently placing in the podium at national championships, most notably as the USA Intermediare I National Champion in 2010 and as the 2017 USA Developing Grand Prix National Champion. Additionally, Parra represented the US at the 2014 World Cup Finals, in Lyon, and again at the Longines FEI World Breeding Championships, in the 7 year old division.

An educator by nature, Parra has dedicated his life to the training of young horses and the coaching of his students. Throughout his career, he has trained over 30 horses from young horses to the FEI level, with some of his biggest achievements coming at the Young Horse Divisions, where many of his horses have been consistently among the top ranked prospects in the U.S. Additionally, he has coached multiple National and International champions.

References

Living people
1963 births
American male equestrians
Colombian male equestrians
Colombian dressage riders
Olympic equestrians of Colombia
Equestrians at the 2004 Summer Olympics
Pan American Games medalists in equestrian
Pan American Games gold medalists for the United States
Pan American Games silver medalists for Colombia
Equestrians at the 1999 Pan American Games
Equestrians at the 2003 Pan American Games
Equestrians at the 2011 Pan American Games
Medalists at the 1999 Pan American Games
Medalists at the 2011 Pan American Games
People from Ibagué